This is the list of episodes for The Tonight Show Starring Jimmy Fallon in 2021.

2021

January

February

March

April

May

June

July

August

September

October

November

December

References

External links
 
 Lineups at Interbridge 

Episodes 2021
Lists of American non-fiction television series episodes
Lists of variety television series episodes